

220001–220100 

|-bgcolor=#f2f2f2
| colspan=4 align=center | 
|}

220101–220200 

|-bgcolor=#f2f2f2
| colspan=4 align=center | 
|}

220201–220300 

|-id=229
| 220229 Hegedüs ||  || Tibor Hegedüs (born 1961), a Hungarian physicist, astronomer, IAU member and director of the Baja Astronomical Observatory || 
|}

220301–220400 

|-bgcolor=#f2f2f2
| colspan=4 align=center | 
|}

220401–220500 

|-id=418
| 220418 Golovyno ||  || The small town of Golovyno, Ukraine, noted for one of Europe's largest labradorite mines || 
|-id=495
| 220495 Margarethe || 2004 DO || Else Margarethe Apitzsch (born 1906), mother of the German discoverer Rolf Apitzsch || 
|}

220501–220600 

|-bgcolor=#f2f2f2
| colspan=4 align=center | 
|}

220601–220700 

|-bgcolor=#f2f2f2
| colspan=4 align=center | 
|}

220701–220800 

|-id=736
| 220736 Niihama ||  || Niihama, the third-largest city in Ehime prefecture, Japan || 
|}

220801–220900 

|-bgcolor=#f2f2f2
| colspan=4 align=center | 
|}

220901–221000 

|-bgcolor=#f2f2f2
| colspan=4 align=center | 
|}

References 

220001-221000